Linda Bengtsson  (born 12 February 1988) is a Swedish football defender who currently plays for Djurgårdens IF. She has played Damallsvenskan football for Hammarby IF.

Career
Bengtsson started her career in Vimmerby IF. During the 2010 and 2011 season, she played for Damallsvenskan side Hammarby IF DFF, where she made a total of nine appearances.

References

1988 births
Living people
Swedish women's footballers
Hammarby Fotboll (women) players
Djurgårdens IF Fotboll (women) players
Damallsvenskan players
Vimmerby IF players
Women's association football defenders